Odile is a feminine given name of French origin, and may refer to:

Characters 
 Odile, the evil black swan of Swan Lake
 Odile de Caray, in the 1966 film Eye of the Devil
 Odile, a principal character in the 1964 Jean-Luc Godard film Bande à part

People
Odile of Cologne (c. 4th century), a saint of the Roman Catholic Church
Odile of Alsace (c. 662–c. 720), a saint of the Roman Catholic Church
Odile Bain (1939-2012), French parasitologist
Odile Baron Supervielle (1915-2016), Uruguayan-born Argentine writer and journalist
Odile Crick (1920–2007), British artist best known for her drawing of the DNA double helix
Odile Defraye (1888–1965), Belgian road-racing bicyclist
Odile Fanton d’Andon, French environmental researcher, CEO of the company ACRI-ST
Odile Gilbert (contemporary), French hairstylist
Odile Harington (born 1961), South African intelligence agent
Odile Jacob (contemporary), French scientist who studies the workings of the brain
Odile Lesage (born 1969), French heptathlete
Odile Saugues (born 1943), French left-wing politician

See also 
 Hurricane Odile (disambiguation)
 Odilon, the masculine form of this name

French feminine given names